Neu Darchau is a municipality in the district Lüchow-Dannenberg, in Lower Saxony, Germany.

References

Lüchow-Dannenberg